Gomphrena prostrata is a plant native to Caatinga and Cerrado vegetation in Brazil, specially in Bahia and São Paulo. This plant is cited in Flora Brasiliensis  by Carl Friedrich Philipp von Martius.

References

prostrata
Flora of Brazil
Flora of the Cerrado